Ernest McFarland (1894–1984) was a U.S. Senator from Arizona from 1941 to 1953.

Senator McFarland may also refer to:

Basil McFarland (1898–1986), Northern Irish Senate
David McFarland (politician) (1822–1902), Wisconsin State Senate
James T. McFarland (born 1930), New York State Senate
Jim McFarland (born 1947), Nebraska State Senate
Noah C. McFarland (1822–1897), Ohio State Senate and Kansas State Senate